WROK may refer to:

 WROK (AM) 1440 in Rockford, Illinois
 WROK-FM, a radio station (95.9 FM) licensed to serve Sebastian, Florida, United States
 WLXF 105.5 in Macon, Georgia, which held the call sign WROK-FM from 2009 to 2016
 "WROK TV" Government-access television (GATV) channel on cable TV in Royal Oak, Michigan